Daggar or Dagar is the capital of Buner District in the Khyber-Pakhtunkhwa province of  Pakistan. Daggar is also an administrative unit (Union council) of Buner District.

Taliban conflict
In April 2009 Tehrik-i-Taliban Pakistan from neighbouring areas entered the district following a peace deal with the government in Swat, Taliban fighters took over government buildings and killed those who resisted. On 22 April 2009, the Taliban took over the town forcing the police to retreat to their stations while they looted aid agency offices. However, on 29 April 2009, the troops of Pakistan Army were deployed in the town as part of an effort to drive out Taliban militants from Buner.

Lightning hotspots
It is one of the top 100 hotspots of lightning according to the research published on ScienceMag.org. The data obtained from satellites between January 1998 and December 2013 showed that this area observed 143 flashes of lightning per km2 per year.

References

Populated places in Buner District
Union Councils of Buner District